United Nations Security Council Resolution 528, adopted on December 21, 1982, after the General Assembly passed Resolution 3190 extolling the virtues of expanded working languages, the Council decided to include Arabic among the working languages of the Security Council.

No details of the voting were given, other than that it was adopted "by consensus".

See also
List of United Nations Security Council Resolutions 501 to 600 (1982–1987)
United Nations Security Council Resolution 263
United Nations Security Council Resolution 345

References 
Text of the Resolution at undocs.org

External links
 

 0528
Arabic language
Language policy in the United Nations
 0528
December 1982 events